Tanzania– United Arab Emirates relations entails the diplomatic relations between Tanzania and the United Arab Emirates. The UAE is one of Tanzania's largest trading partner and have had cordial relationship for many years.

Trade
The Trade balance between the UAE and Tanzania stands at around $2 billion annually, in the UAE's favor. UAE is Tanzania's number three importer and mainly imports refined petroleum products. In 2013 Tanzania imported $1.14 billion worth of goods from the UAE with 53% of that being refined petroleum products; while in 2013 the UAE imported $85 million worth of goods from Tanzania, mainly agriculture products. The UAE is the largest buyer of cloves from Tanzania.

Transport links
Various Emirati airlines operate from the UAE to Tanzania. Currently 3 Emirati airlines fly to Tanzania regularly, namely Emirates and Flydubai from Dubai and Etihad from Abu Dhabi. These air links are vital for the Tanzania economy as they facilitate business and bring in Tourists. Tourism is Tanzania's largest foreign exchange earner.

Diplomatic mission
Tanzania maintains an embassy in Abu Dhabi and a consulate in Dubai.

The UAE also maintains an embassy in Dar es Salaam.

See also 
 Foreign relations of Tanzania
 Foreign relations of the United Arab Emirates

References

External links

 
United Arab Emirates
Bilateral relations of the United Arab Emirates